Eastern Shore is a provincial electoral district in Nova Scotia, Canada, that elects one member of the Nova Scotia House of Assembly.

In 1967, the district was created as Halifax Eastern Shore. Upon the recommendations of the 1992 Electoral Boundaries Commission report, the district name was changed to Eastern Shore and it gained the Upper Lawrencetown area from Cole Harbour. In 2003, it gained an area on its western boundary from Dartmouth-Cole Harbour and lost an area on its eastern boundary to Guysborough-Sheet Harbour. In 2013, the district lost the Ross Road area to Preston-Dartmouth.

It is known as a bellwether district, having elected a government representative in every election since 1970.

Geography

Members of the Legislative Assembly
This riding has elected the following Members of the Legislative Assembly:

Election results

1967 general election

1970 general election

1974 general election

1978 general election

1981 general election

1984 general election

1988 general election

1993 general election

1998 general election

1999 general election

2003 general election

2006 general election

2009 general election

2013 general election

|-
 
|Liberal
|Kevin Murphy
|align="right"|3,770
|align="right"|52.99
|align="right"|-39.53
|-
 
|New Democratic Party
|Sid Prest
|align="right"|1,922
|align="right"|27.01
|align="right"|-22.21
|-
 
|Progressive Conservative
|Steve Brine
|align="right"|1,423
|align="right"|20.00
|align="right"|-14.69

 
|}

2017 general election

2021 general election

References

External links
CBC riding profile
 June 13, 2006 Nova Scotia Provincial General Election Poll By Poll Results

Nova Scotia provincial electoral districts
Politics of Halifax, Nova Scotia